Eugenio Tosi (6 May 1864 – 7 January 1929) was an Italian cardinal of the Catholic Church. He served as Archbishop of Milan from 1922 until his death, and was elevated to the cardinalate in 1922.

Biography

Early life
Tosi was born in Busto Arsizio, and studied at the seminaries of Monza and Milan. Ordained to the priesthood on 4 June 1887, he entered the Oblates of Saints Ambrose and Charles in 1889, after serving as a curate in Busto. Tosi then taught at the Missionary House of the Oblates in Rho until 1909, when he was made vicar general of Rimini.

On 5 April 1911, Tosi was appointed Bishop of Squillace by Pope Pius X. He received his episcopal consecration on the following 16 April from Andrea Cardinal Ferrari. After becoming Bishop of Andria on 22 March 1917, he served as apostolic administrator of Squillace from 10 August 1917 to February 1918.

Cardinal Archbishop of Milan
Pope Pius XI named Tosi to succeed him as Archbishop of Milan on 7 March 1922 and created him Cardinal-Priest of Ss. Silvestro e Martino ai Monti in the consistory of 11 December the same year. He publicly denounced the playing of the opera The Martyrdom of San Sebastian, which Catholics were prohibited from seeing, at La Scala in 1926.

Death
Cardinal Tosi died after a long illness in Milan, at age 64. He is buried before the altar of the Virgo potens in the Milan Cathedral.

References

Bibliography

External links
Cardinals of the Holy Roman Church
Catholic-Hierarchy

1864 births
1929 deaths
People from Busto Arsizio
20th-century Italian cardinals
Archbishops of Milan
20th-century Italian Roman Catholic archbishops
Burials at Milan Cathedral